Shaun Richard Farrell (born 5 March 1975 in Christchurch, New Zealand) was a sprinter/middle distance runner who competed for New Zealand.

Farrell competed in the 400m at the 1994 World Juniors Athletics Championships in Portugal. He placed 3rd in the Final running 46.31 seconds.

He participated in the 1994 and 1998 Commonwealth Games, competing in the 400m and 800m. He is the current New Zealand record holder over 400m.

Personal bests

References

1975 births
Living people
New Zealand male sprinters
New Zealand male middle-distance runners
Commonwealth Games competitors for New Zealand
Athletes (track and field) at the 1994 Commonwealth Games
Athletes (track and field) at the 1998 Commonwealth Games
Athletes from Christchurch